Erbol Orynbayev (Erbol Tūrmahanūly Orynbaev, born 29 June 1971 in Shymkent, South Kazakhstan) is the former Deputy Prime Minister of Kazakhstan (2007-2013).

He has held a number of other senior ranking positions within the Government of Kazakhstan, including as Aide to the President on Economic Policy (2013-2015) and as Head of the Prime Minister's Office (2007-2008). For many years, he served as the Governor of the World Bank on behalf of the Government of Kazakhstan.

He has also served as a board member of the National Bank of Kazakhstan, Agency for Regulations of Financial Markets as well as for large companies and nonprofits, including sovereign wealth fund Samruk-Kazyna, the national oil company KazMunayGas, Nazarbayev University and Nazarbayev Intellectual Schools.

Education 
Mr. Orynbayev is the graduate in law from Lomonosov Moscow State University (1989—1993) and Duke University (2000—2002), Master degree in International Economic Development.

Career 
He began his career in the private sector having worked for banks and private companies. He co-founded a number of finance, trade and certification companies. 

From 1996, he took senior positions at Kazakhstan Government and international financial institutions. Among those Mr. Orynbayev was Deputy Governor (Akim) of South Kazakhstan Region (1996–1997), Vice Minister of Economy and Budget Planning of the Republic of Kazakhstan (2002–2003), Deputy Prime Minister of the Republic of Kazakhstan (2007–2013), Aide to the President of the Republic of Kazakhstan on economic issues (2013–2015), managing director at International Bank for Reconstruction and Development, Member of the board of directors at National Bank of Kazakhstan and Agency for Regulation and Supervision of Financial Market and Financial Organizations.

Since his resignation from the public sector in 2015, he has held a number of senior positions in private financial, research and technology companies.

National awards 

 "Parasat" Order (2012);
 "Kurmet" Order (2006).

References

1971 births
Living people
Place of birth missing (living people)
Nur Otan politicians
Deputy Prime Ministers of Kazakhstan